The 2005 NFL Draft was the procedure by which National Football League teams selected amateur college football players. It is officially known as the NFL Annual Player Selection Meeting. The draft was held April 23–24, 2005. The league also held a supplemental draft that year, which was held after the regular draft but before the regular season. The draft took place at the Jacob K. Javits Convention Center in New York City, and was televised for the 26th consecutive year on ESPN and ESPN2. It was the first to be held at the Javits Center after Madison Square Garden was utilized for previous drafts since 1995.

The draft is best known for quarterback Aaron Rodgers falling to the 24th selection after being projected as one of the top picks. Although Rodgers believed he would be taken first overall by the San Francisco 49ers, the 49ers selected quarterback Alex Smith, and Rodgers was passed on by teams with other positional needs until he was drafted by the Green Bay Packers. Rodgers' fall drew retrospective scrutiny due to developing a reputation as one of the greatest quarterbacks of all time.

Compensatory selections were distributed amongst fourteen teams, with the Philadelphia Eagles and the St. Louis Rams garnering the most with four picks each. Three of the first five picks were running backs, an NFL draft first.

The 255 players chosen in the draft were composed of:

Player selections

Supplemental draft selections
For each player selected in the supplemental draft, the team forfeited its pick in that round in the draft of the following season.

Notable undrafted players

Hall of Famers

 DeMarcus Ware, linebacker from Troy, taken 1st round 11th overall by the Dallas Cowboys.
Inducted: Professional Football Hall of Fame Class of 2023.

Trades
In the explanations below, (PD) indicates trades completed prior to the start of the draft (i.e. Pre-Draft), while (D) denotes trades that took place during the 2005 draft.

Round one

Round two

Round three

Round four

Round five

Round six

Round seven

References

General

Specific

External links
 
 

National Football League Draft
NFL Draft
Draft
NFL draft
NFL Draft
American football in New York City
2000s in Manhattan
Sporting events in New York City
Sports in Manhattan